Colours of My Life is a 2011 compilation album by Australian recording artist Judith Durham. The album was released in November 2011. A DVD was also included featuring an interview with Judith Durham by Peter Thompson.

In a December 2011 interview with 'Beauty and Lace' Durham said "Colours of My Life is a retrospective of all the albums I’ve recorded in 50 years. There are all styles of songs and composing, even me playing ragtime piano." adding it "would appeal to anyone who wants to share my musical journey through all the different styles."

Track listing
 "Colours of My Life"	
 "Moan You Mourners" (Bessie Smith)
 "Georgy Girl" (Tom Springfield, Jim Dale)
 "The Olive Tree"	(Diane Lampert, Tom Springfield)
 "Maple Leaf Rag" (Scott Joplin)  (Live at The Talk of the Town) 	
 "Just a Closer Walk with Thee" (trad.)
 "The Light is Dark Enough" (Maitland, Kerr)	
 "Skyline Pigeon" (Elton John, Bernie Taupin)
 "I Wanna Dance to Your Music"	(Judith Durham)
 "Body and Soul" (Edward Heyman, Robert Sour, Frank Eyton, Johnny Green)
 "What'll I Do"	(Irving Berlin)
 "My Buddy" (Walter Donaldson, Gus Kahn)
 "Australia Land of Today" (Durham)
 "When Starlight Fades" (Durham, H. Cock, Ron Edgeworth)
 "It's Hard to Leave" (Durham)	
 "End of the World"	(Skeeter Davis)
 "Far Shore"	
 "Fifties Medley" (made up of "You Belong To Me", "It’s Impossible" and "Wonderful! Wonderful!")	
 "The Carnival is Over" (Springfield)	
 "His Eye is on the Sparrow" (Civilla D. Martin, Charles H. Gabriel)
 "I Celebrate Your Life My Baby" (Durham)
 "Climb Ev'ry Mountain" (Oscar Hammerstein II, Richard Rodgers)

Charts

Weekly charts
Colours of My Life debuted at number 57 and peaked at 40 the following week.

Year-end charts

Tour
In April 2012, Durham announced dates for the "Colour of My Life'' tour. This was her first solo tour since 2001.

 June 30: Riverside Theatre, Perth
 July 3: Adelaide Entertainment Centre, Adelaide
 July 5: Derwent Entertainment Centre, Hobart
 July 7: Her Majesty's Theatre, Melbourne
 July 8: Her Majesty's Theatre, Melbourne
 July 11: Brisbane Convention & Exhibition Centre, Brisbane
 July 13: Concert Hall, Sydney Opera House, Sydney
 July 14: Concert Hall, Sydney Opera House, Sydney
 July 16: Royal Theatre, National Convention Centre, Canberra

References

2011 greatest hits albums
Judith Durham compilation albums
Decca Records compilation albums
Universal Music Australia albums